Jeong Hye-jin (born 18 April 1995) is a South Korean judoka.

She participated at the 2018 World Judo Championships, winning a medal.

References

External links

1995 births
Living people
South Korean female judoka
Judoka at the 2018 Asian Games
Asian Games bronze medalists for South Korea
Asian Games medalists in judo
Medalists at the 2018 Asian Games
20th-century South Korean women
21st-century South Korean women